Terry O'Donnell (born November 1, 1963) is an American politician and a member of the Republican Party who has served as the Oklahoma House Representative for the 23rd district since January 8, 2013. He first won elected office in the 2012 Oklahoma state elections. In January 2021, O'Donnell was promoted to be the speaker pro tempore of the Oklahoma House of Representatives, the second highest ranking Republican Party of Oklahoma member in the state house. On December 17, 2021, O'Donnell was indicted in relation to a Tag Agency corruption scandal. He resigned as speaker pro tempore on February 2, 2022.

Legislative career
O'Donnell was first elected to the Oklahoma House of Representatives in the 2012 Oklahoma state elections to represent district 23. O'Donnell is from Catoosa, Oklahoma. He will be term limited from the Oklahoma State Legislature in 2024.

2012 election
O'Donnell was first elected as the State House Representative for district 23 in the 2012 Oklahoma state elections.

2016 election
The Tulsa World endorsed O'Donnell in his 2016 re-election bid.

56th Oklahoma legislature
In 2018, during the second session of the 56th Oklahoma Legislature, O'Donnell supported multiple bills to loosen the regulation of tag agencies. He voted in favor of both HB 3278 and SB 1439. HB 3278  allowed a tag agent to submit a letter of resignation "contingent on the appointment" of a specific replacement. SB 1439 removed the requirement that the Oklahoma Tax Commission interview all applicants for tag agent positions.

57th Oklahoma legislature
In 2019, during the first session of the 57th Oklahoma Legislature, O'Donnell introduced HB 2098 which allowed the spouses of legislators to serve as tag agents. 
During floor debate only one member, Democratic Representative Shane Stone, questioned the bill asking "I feel like voting for this could be a little self-serving, wouldn’t you agree?” O'Donnell responded that "I think it restores your right as a citizen." Stone and two Republican Representatives, Tom Gann and Tommy Hardin, were the only no votes in the Oklahoma House. Eight Republican Senators voted no. In April 2019, Governor Kevin Stitt signed the bill into law.

2020 election
In August 2019, the Oklahoma Tax Commission appointed O'Donnell's wife, Teresa O'Donnell, to succeed her mother as the head of the Catoosa Tag Agency.
During the election, Oklahoma City Democratic State Representative Collin Walke criticized O'Donnell tag agency reforms saying "The timing of Rep. O’Donnell’s legislation in connection with the timing of the transfer of his mother-in-law’s tag agency to his wife smacks of self-dealing; and at best, created an appearance of impropriety that should have kept Rep. O’Donnell from running the bill in the first place."
O'Donnell responded by saying he did not know his wife would be acquiring her mother's tag agency until after the latter's death in July 2019.

58th Oklahoma legislature
O'Donnell served as the second highest-ranking Republican in the Oklahoma House of Representatives for the first session of the 58th Oklahoma Legislature. He resigned from leadership before the second session of the 58th Oklahoma legislature.

On December 17, 2021, Terry O'Donnell was indicted on five felony and three misdemeanor charges, including conspiracy against the state, related to his 2019 Tax Agency bill. Teresa O'Donnell was also indicted on three felony and one misdemeanor charge. The indictment alleges that O'Donnell violated his oath of office by knowingly removing statutory requirement that could have prohibited his wife from functionally inheriting a tag agent position from her mother and that he knew his family would profit from the position. O'Donnell has since described the indictment as a being driven by the "woke left" and "Oklahoma City operatives". Oklahoma County District Attorney David Prater has been prosecuting corruption cases against state lawmakers for 16 years.

Grand Jury Investigation 
In 2022, District Attorney David Prater used a grand jury that also investigated the Oklahoma Pardon and Parole Board and Governor Kevin Stitt  to "continue working a case that he had begun in front of the state’s multi-county grand jury earlier in 2021. Rep. Terry O’Donnell (R-Catoosa) and his wife, Teresa, were indicted Dec. 17 on a combined seven criminal counts related to his authorship of a bill that legalized her ability to become a state-appointed tag agent in Catoosa." The "investigation into the Pardon and Parole Board began in October," but Prater "was the second prosecutor to be involved in the matter." While the O'Donnells are not specifically named in the report, they are "accused of using his influence as a lawmaker and member of House leadership to change law to allow the transfer of a tag agency earning about $100,000 a year to Teresa O’Donnell from her late mother." The case "is pending in Oklahoma County and the O’Donnells have maintained their innocence. Terry O’Donnell stepped down from a top House leadership position in January and filed for reelection in April." The grand jury "ran out of time regarding other possible charges from the O’Donnell case and left it up to the district attorney’s office to determine if others should be charged. By law, county grand jury terms can’t be within 30 days of a major election. Oklahoma’s primary election is June 28."

References

1963 births
21st-century American politicians
Living people
Republican Party members of the Oklahoma House of Representatives